The 2007 Tuvalu A-Division was the third season of association football competition. The league was won by Nauti FC for the second time. the league returned to the single division format from the two pool format with a play-off used in the previous season. The league, which started on 17 February,  was renamed, TNPF Soccer League.

References

Tuvalu A-Division seasons
Tuvalu
football